The name Mirinae has been used for three tropical cyclones in the Western Pacific Ocean. The name was contributed by South Korea and means the Milky Way in the Jeju language. It replaced the name Sudal on the Japan Meteorological Agency naming list.

 Typhoon Mirinae (2009) (T0921, 23W, Santi) – made landfall on Luzon, Philippines, and later Southern Vietnam.
 Tropical Storm Mirinae (2016) (T1603, 05W) – made landfall on Hainan, China, and later on Northern Vietnam.
 Tropical Storm Mirinae (2021) (T2110, 14W, Gorio) – remained out to sea.

Pacific typhoon set index articles